The following lists events that happened during 1829 in Chile.

Incumbents
President of Chile: Francisco Antonio Pinto (-2 November), Francisco Ramón Vicuña(2 November-7 December)

Events 
Chilean Civil War of 1829–30

May
15–16 May - The Chilean presidential election, 1829 reelects Pinto as president.

November
2 November - President Pinto resigns and is replaced by vice president Francisco Ramón Vicuña.

Births

Deaths
12 September - Juan Ignacio Molina (b. 1740)

References 

 
1820s in Chile
Chile
Chile